Cholchol Formation is a geological formation composed of sediments that were deposited during the Miocene in the Temuco Basin of south–central Chile. The sediments were deposited in a marine environment.

References 

Geologic formations of Chile
Miocene Series of South America
Neogene Chile
Shale formations
Sandstone formations
Tuff formations
Geology of Araucanía Region